Norealidys is a replacement name for preoccupied earthworm genus Reynoldsia  - non Reynoldsia  (Diptera : Muscidae) [nec botanical genus Reynoldsia of flowering plant family Araliaceae] - under ICZN (1999)  as previously flagged.  The genus is currently monotypic, with Norealidys andaluciana as the sole species.

References 

Lumbricidae